Campbell High School is a public high school and International Baccalaureate magnet school located in Smyrna, Georgia (U.S.), northwest of Atlanta. It is part of the Cobb County School District. The school implemented the International Baccalaureate diploma program in 1997, serving as a magnet school for the Cobb County School District.

History 

The school was  named after Orme Campbell, the mother of the man who donated the land on which the original school was built, with the stipulation that the name of the school could never be changed. Orme Campbell High School opened in 1952 with the merger of Smyrna High School and Fitzhugh Lee High School. It opened with 425 students in grades 8-11.

In 1989, Orme Campbell High School and F.T. Wills High School merged to form Smyrna High School. Before the merger, Campbell students were known as the Green and White "Panthers" and Wills students were known as the Red and Black "Tigers". The students united in selecting new colors, royal blue and silver, and a new mascot, the "Spartans".

In 1990, the courts overruled the name change of the school because of stipulations in the original deed restrictions on the property that the school sited there must be named for the Campbell family, and the name "Campbell High School" was reinstated. Since the ruling pertained only to the school name, it was decided the new colors and the new mascot would be left unchanged. In 1997, the school was relocated to the site of the original Wills High School because of rapid growth, but kept the Campbell name in order to maintain a consistent identity.

Demographics 
The breakdown of the 2,869 students enrolled for the 2021–22 school year:
Male – 46.8%
Female – 53.2%
Native American/Alaskan – 0.3%
Asian – 4.9%
Black – 40.4%
Hispanic – 31.0%
"Native Hawaiian/Pacific Islander" – 0.035%
White – 19.6%
Multiracial – 2.7%

International Baccalaureate program 
In fall 1997, Campbell implemented the International Baccalaureate (IB) program to function as a magnet program in Cobb County. The program, currently under the leadership of Dan Penick and Max Jones, has had extremely high scores on IB exams, averaging 5.30 compared to 4.79 worldwide. The CHS IB pass rate in 2014 was 98% and in 2015 was 88%. To compare, in 2014, the pass rate in Georgia was 66%, 76% in the US, and 80% worldwide. In 2015, the pass rate worldwide was 80%.

Students throughout Cobb County apply to the IB program during the fall of their 8th grade year. If accepted, students are enrolled in a rigorous curriculum in 9th and 10th grade during which they complete the majority of the Georgia required courses for graduation. In 11th and 12th grades, the students are enrolled in the IB Diploma curriculum.

Notable alumni 
 McKinley Belcher III, actor
 C. Martin Croker, animation artist/director and voice actor
 Tay Glover-Wright, American football player
 Chris Lewis-Harris, defensive back for the Cincinnati Bengals
 Brian Oliver (Wills Class of 1986), basketball player
 Julia Roberts,  Academy Award-winning actress

Facilities 
Over 15 hallways and six buildings make up Campbell High School. The main building is composed of the original Nash Middle School and Wills High School buildings, connected by a media center, main office suites, the Livingston Auditorium, and the dining hall. The 1000 Building (science) is at the rear of the school, adjacent to the fieldhouse.

Along the northern end of campus is the 2000 Building (constructed January 2008), which replaced 12 portable classrooms and added many courses the school had previously not offered. Adjacent to that building are the new greenhouse and horticulture buildings.

In 2007, new fine arts classes were built, and others moved to make room for the growing programs. The state-of-the-art Band Hall has seven practice rooms, five instrument/uniform storage rooms, a connected office/music library, as well as the vast main room. The Band and Choral Halls were constructed using the same standards as Allatoona High, the newest prototype high school in the county. The old Band Room was renovated and expanded, making room for the Campbell Orchestra, while the Campbell drama department found a new home within the old choral and orchestra suites, which were modified to create a black-box theater and a technical theater classroom. In addition to the new small theater, the school's drama department maintains its original black-box, recently christened "The Asylum Black-Box Theatre at Campbell High School".

McDaniel Stadium (refurbished with new artificial turf and other amenities in fall 2010), is at the rear of the school. It runs parallel to the connected back parking lot and bus port, which functions as the practice field for the Spartan Marching Band in the fall. Across Ward Street from the main office are the tennis courts and practice fields, as well as athletic fields for both softball and baseball.

References

External links 
 

Schools in Cobb County, Georgia
Public high schools in Georgia (U.S. state)
Educational institutions established in 1952
1952 establishments in Georgia (U.S. state)